Yvonne Brulatour Sciò (born 25 July 1969) is an Italian model and actress.

Biography
Born in Rome, Sciò started her career as a runway model in the late 1980s. 
Following her acting debut in the Sergio Martino's TV-series Rally in 1988, she became first known for a series of Sip commercials broadcast between 1989 and the early 1990s.

In 1990 she had her first significant film role in Carlo Verdone's Stasera a casa di Alice, then, in 1991 she was hosted a segment in the successful variety show Non è la Rai. After several TV and film appearances, in the mid-1990s Sciò moved in the US, where she worked mainly on television, notably appearing in the TV-series Nikita, in the miniseries Rose Red, and playing investigator Elyssa Collins in the soap opera One Life to Live. She also appeared in the music video for Tal Bachman's song "She's So High" in 1999.

In 2005 she claimed to be physically attacked by Naomi Campbell.

Sciò married the film producer Stefano Dammicco on November 12, 2005.

Filmography

References

External links
 
 Official website

Living people
1969 births
Actresses from Rome
Italian female models
Italian film actresses
Italian television actresses